The 1992–93 UEFA Champions League preliminary round was the qualifying round for the 1992–93 UEFA Champions League, and featured eight teams. It began on 19 August with the first legs and ended on 2 September 1992 with the second legs. The four winners advanced to the first round, joining 28 other teams.

Times are CEST (UTC+2), as listed by UEFA.

Format
Each tie was played over two legs, with each team playing one leg at home. The team that scored more goals on aggregate over the two legs advanced to the next round. If the aggregate score was level, the away goals rule was applied, i.e. the team that scored more goals away from home over the two legs advanced. If away goals were also equal, then extra time was played. The away goals rule would be again applied after extra time, i.e. if there were goals scored during extra time and the aggregate score was still level, the visiting team advanced by virtue of more away goals scored. If no goals were scored during extra time, the tie was decided by penalty shoot-out.

Draw
The draw for the preliminary round was held on 15 July 1992 in Geneva, Switzerland.

Summary

The first legs were played on 19 August, and the second legs on 2 September 1992.

|}

Matches

Tavriya Simferopol won 2–1 on aggregate.

Maccabi Tel Aviv won 3–1 on aggregate.

Skonto won 6–1 on aggregate.

Olimpija Ljubljana won 5–0 on aggregate.

References

External links

Preliminary round
UEFA Champions League qualifying rounds
August 1992 sports events in Europe
September 1992 sports events in Europe